Swift and Shift Couriers is an Australian comedy television series that first screened on SBS TV in October 2008. The series is produced, directed and written by Paul Fenech, who was also responsible for the comedy series Pizza. It is set around the staff of the fictional 'Swift and Shift' Courier Company, in the central business district of Sydney. Episodes have been partly filmed in Egypt, India, Thailand and the United States.

The second season of Swift and Shift Couriers began screening on 15 August 2011, on SBS One.

The first and second season of Swift and Shift Couriers came out on DVD, The complete series box set came out after by Madman Entertainment.

Cast

Management:
 Ian Turpie as Keith Warne
 Amanda Keller as Amanda Doyle
 Brendan Jones as Jonathon Turnbull
 Melissa Tkautz as Melissa Shembry
 Nick Godsell (credited as The DarkSide) as Damien Payne
 Nicola Parry as Karen Smythe
 Anthony Salame as Anthony Sukor

Drivers:
 Paul Fenech as Paul "Mario" Gauci
 Sam Greco as Louie "Luigi" Marietti
 Mark Duncan as Mark Tanner
 Mike Duncan as Mike Tanner
 Ashur Shimon as Abdul Azar
 Andrew Ausage as Sole Umaga
 Joe Lee Hoi Chuen as Jackie Leungfung
 Bill Drury as Bill Beazley
 Jennifer Corfield as Jen Beazley
 Tahir Bilgiç as Habib

Dispatch:
 David Cooper as David Jackman
 Jioji Ravulo as Leonard Umaga
 Alex Romano as Alex Carlos
 Jim Webb as Jim Spooner
 Murray Harman as Murray Smith

Call Centre:
 Kirsty Lee Allan as Leanne Murdoch
 Renzo Bellato as Renzo Ballini
 Maret Archer as Doreen Ballini
 Elle Dawe as Elle Whick
 Jan Bakker as Jan
 Oliver Miletic as Oliver Vlacic (Is almost always mistakenly called Darren by Keith.)
 Clarissa Morrison as Clarissa

Loading Dock:
 Kevin Taumata as Kiwi Kev
 Aaron McTaggart as JJ
 Nicholas Moala as Sam
 Angry Anderson as Aaron "Agro" Smith
 Stuart Rawe as George Darwin

Guest Cast:
 Mario Fenech as himself
 Orlando Scolese as Fernando the florist, regular client
 Dilshan Rain as Vikram Jayasili, Indian dispatch worker
 Raphael Materese as Momo Gauci, Paul's uncle
 Waseem Khan as Indian Taxi Driver and Parking Officer
 Ara Natarian as Omar Azar, Abdul's cousin
 Russell Gilbert as David Cobbgrove, Sam Cobbgrove, and Scooter Guy
 Bessie Bardot as Paula Dainty and Reporter
 Tottie Goldsmith as Andrea Walsh and Fashion Woman
 John Mangos as News Guy
 Rob Shehadie as Fadi El Faik and Sharbel the Mechanic
 Garry Who as Gary Hibbett, the Safety Inspector

Filming Location

Swift and Shift's Hashfield Depot was located and filmed at 37-53 Constitution Road, Meadowbank NSW 2114. Hashfield is a fictional suburb, and also the implied location of another Paul Fenech series, Pizza. Some episodes were also in other parts of Australia and in Thailand, India, the United States and the Middle East. The building that Swift and Shift's depot was filmed in has since been demolished.

See also
 List of Australian television series
 Fat Pizza
 Housos
 Housos vs. Authority, film

References

External links
 

Australian comedy television series
Special Broadcasting Service original programming
Television shows set in New South Wales
2008 Australian television series debuts
2011 Australian television series endings
English-language television shows